Hiram Fong Jr. (October 13, 1939 – February 18, 2017) was an American politician. He served as a Republican member of the Hawaii House of Representatives.

Life and career 
Fong was the son of Hiram Fong, a politician.

In 1971, Fong was elected to the Hawaii House of Representatives, serving until 1979. In the same year, he was a member of the Honolulu City Council, serving until 1983.

Fong died in February 2017, at the age of 77.

References 

1939 births
2017 deaths
Republican Party members of the Hawaii House of Representatives
20th-century American politicians
Honolulu City Council members